The NONCODE database  is a collection of expression and functional lncRNA data obtained from re-annotated microarray studies.

See also
 lncRNA

References

External links
 http://www.noncode.org

Biological databases
RNA
Non-coding RNA